The 2006 Coppa Italia Final was the final of the 2005–06 Coppa Italia, the 59th season of the top cup competition in Italian football. The match was played over two legs between Roma and Internazionale. This was the second final between these two clubs, the match being the replay of previous season's final. The first leg was played in Rome on 3 May 2006, while the second leg on 11 May 2006. Inter won the trophy with an aggregate result of 4–2. With this victory, Internazionale manager Roberto Mancini won the Coppa Italia for the tenth time, six as a player, four as a coach.

First leg

Second leg

References

Coppa Italia Final
Coppa Italia Finals
Coppa Italia Final 2006
Coppa Italia Final 2006